The Ponca Creek Bridge, also known as NEHBS No. BD00-224, is a historic Pratt truss bridge spanning Ponca Creek that is listed on the National Register of Historic Places.

The "half-hip" pony truss bridge was built in 1904 as a single-span bridge having a  main span and, with timber stringer approach span having a  total length.

The steel bridge was fabricated by Lackawanna Steel Co. of Pittsburgh, Pennsylvania.  It was built by E. Roy Townsend of O'Neill, Nebraska.

The original bridge may no longer be in place.

Notes

References

Bridges on the National Register of Historic Places in Nebraska
Bridges completed in 1904
Buildings and structures in Boyd County, Nebraska
Transportation in Boyd County, Nebraska
Steel bridges in the United States
Pratt truss bridges in the United States
Road bridges in Nebraska